Agnolo Firenzuola (28 September 149327 June 1543) was an Italian poet and litterateur.

Biography
Agnolo Firenzuola was born at Florence. The family name was taken from the town of Firenzuola, situated at the foot of the Apennines, its original home. Agnolo's grandfather had obtained the citizenship of Florence and transmitted it to his family. Agnolo was destined for the profession of the law, and pursued his studies first at Siena and afterwards at Perugia. There he became the associate of the notorious Pietro Aretino, whose foul life he was not ashamed to make the model of his own. They met again at Rome, where Agnolo practised for a time the profession of an advocate, but with little success. Firenzuola left Rome after the death of Pope Clement VII, and after spending some time at Florence, settled at Prato as abbot of San Salvatore.

It is asserted by all his biographers that while still a young man he assumed the monastic dress at Vallombrosa, and that he afterwards held successively two abbacies. Girolamo Tiraboschi alone ventures to doubt this account, partly on the ground of Firenzuola's licentiousness, and partly on the ground of absence of evidence; but his arguments are not held to be conclusive.

His writings, of which a collected edition was published in 1548, are partly in prose and partly in verse, and belong to the lighter classes of literature. Among the prose works are Discorsi degli animali, imitations of Oriental and Aesopian fables, of which there are two French translations; Dialogo delle bellezze delle donne, also translated into French; Ragionamenti amorosi, a series of short tales in the manner of Boccaccio, rivalling him in elegance and in licentiousness; Discacciamento delle nuove lettere, a controversial piece against Giangiorgio Trissino's proposal to introduce new letters into the Italian alphabet; a free version or adaptation of The Golden Ass of Apuleius, which became a favorite book and passed through many editions; and two comedies, I Lucidi, an imitation of the Menaechmi of Plautus, and La Trinuzia, which in some points resembles the Calandria of Cardinal Bibbiena.

His poems are chiefly satirical and burlesque. All his works are esteemed as models of literary excellence, and are cited as authorities in the vocabulary of the Accademia della Crusca. The date of Firenzuola's death is only approximately ascertained. He had been dead several years when the first edition of his writings appeared (1548).

References

Bibliography 
Agnolo Firenzuola, On the Beauty of Women, trans. Konrad Eisenbichler and Jacqueline Murray. Philadelphia: University of Pennsylvania Press, 1992.

External links

 

1493 births
1543 deaths
University of Siena alumni
University of Perugia alumni
Writers from Florence
Italian dramatists and playwrights